Hans Wetterström (11 December 1923 – 17 November 1980) was a Swedish sprint canoer. He competed in the 10,000 m doubles event at the 1948, 1952 and 1956 Olympics and finished in first, second and fourth place, respectively.

Wetterström also won four medals at the ICF Canoe Sprint World Championships with two golds (K-2 10000 m: 1950, K-4 1000 m: 1948) and two silvers (K-4 1000 m: 1950, K-4 10000 m: 1954).

References
 

Hans Wetterström. Swedish Olympic Committee

External links
 
 

1923 births
1980 deaths
Canoeists at the 1948 Summer Olympics
Canoeists at the 1952 Summer Olympics
Canoeists at the 1956 Summer Olympics
Olympic canoeists of Sweden
Olympic gold medalists for Sweden
Olympic silver medalists for Sweden
Swedish male canoeists
Olympic medalists in canoeing
ICF Canoe Sprint World Championships medalists in kayak
Medalists at the 1952 Summer Olympics
Medalists at the 1948 Summer Olympics
People from Nyköping Municipality
Sportspeople from Södermanland County